Masahisa (written: 昌久, 正久 or 政尚) is a masculine Japanese given name. Notable people with the name include:

, Japanese economist
, Japanese photographer
, Japanese samurai
, Japanese politician
, Japanese pastor
, Japanese yakuza member
, Japanese pastor, theologian and critic

Japanese masculine given names